My Heart Sings is a 1951 Italian comedy film directed by Mario Mattoli and starring Ferruccio Tagliavini.

Cast
 Ferruccio Tagliavini - Marco
 Franca Marzi - Gina
 Riccardo Billi - Riccardo
 Mario Riva - Mario
 Carlo Campanini - Bossoli
 Dorian Gray - Amica di Cocciaglia
 Bice Valori - Liliana
 Guglielmo Inglese - Brigadiere Bichetti
 Giorgio Bixio - Avvocato Pelletti
 Silvana Jachino - Cameriera
 Alberto Sorrentino
 Nino Manfredi - Enrico
 Margherita Autuori - Elsa
 Bruno Lanzarini - Commissario
 Vera Carmi - Madre di Enrico
 Carlo Romano - Commendator Russo
 Adriana Montuori
 Karl Ludwig Diehl - Neurologo
 Loris Gizzi - Commendator Cocciaglia

External links

1951 films
1950s Italian-language films
1951 comedy films
Italian black-and-white films
Films directed by Mario Mattoli
Films with screenplays by Ruggero Maccari
Italian comedy films
1950s Italian films